3710 Bogoslovskij, provisionally known as , is a rare-type asteroid from the central region of the asteroid belt, approximately 11 kilometers in diameter.

It was discovered on 13 September 1978, by Soviet astronomer Nikolai Chernykh at the Crimean Astrophysical Observatory in Nauchnyj, on the Crimean peninsula, and named for Russian composer Nikita Bogoslovskij.

Orbit and characterization 

Bogoslovskij orbits the Sun in the central main-belt at a distance of 2.3–3.2 AU once every 4 years and 6 months (1,658 days). Its orbit has an eccentricity of 0.16 and an inclination of 14° with respect to the ecliptic.

In the SMASS classification, Bogoslovskij is an uncommon Cgh-type, which belongs to the broader class of carbonaceous asteroids. As of 2017, no rotational lightcurve has been obtained. The body's rotation period, poles and shape remain unknown.

Naming 

This minor planet was named in honor of Nikita Bogoslovskij (1913–2004), Russian writer and contemporary composer, on the occasion of his eightieth birthday. The approved naming citation was published by the Minor Planet Center on 1 September 1993.

References

External links 
 Asteroid Lightcurve Database (LCDB), query form (info )
 Dictionary of Minor Planet Names, Google books
 Asteroids and comets rotation curves, CdR – Observatoire de Genève, Raoul Behrend
 Discovery Circumstances: Numbered Minor Planets (1)-(5000) – Minor Planet Center
 
 

003710
Discoveries by Nikolai Chernykh
Named minor planets
003710
19780913